Maria Dallas (born Marina Devcich, 1946) was discovered at a talent contest in small town of Morrinsville, New Zealand. 

Her first single "Tumblin' Down", written by Jay Epae, released in 1966 and made it to #11 in the charts. It also won her a Loxene Golden Disc award.
She released several albums and singles and starred in the New Zealand television series Golden Girl before moving on to Australia in 1967 recording "Ambush" charting #20 in Australia and then to Nashville. She returned to New Zealand in 1970 and scored a #1 hit with the song "Pinocchio".  The song spent six weeks at number one during the autumn of the year. In total, Dallas produced at least 10 albums and 25 singles. "Pinocchio" peaked at number 96 in Australia in March 1971.

Personal life
Dallas met Barry Kairl while she was performing in Brisbane, and he became her manager. They married in 1968, and had a daughter in May 1969. The relationship ended in 1983.

Discography

Studio albums
 Country Girl (1966, Viking)
 The Second Album (1966, Viking)
 Maria Dallas In Nashville (1967, Viking)
 Western Take-Off (1967, Viking)
 Face To Face (1967, Viking)
 Tumblin' Down (1968, RCA Victor)
 Pinocchio (1970, Viking)
 Town And Country (1972, Viking)

Awards and nominations

Aotearoa Music Awards
The Aotearoa Music Awards (previously known as New Zealand Music Awards (NZMA)) are an annual awards night celebrating excellence in New Zealand music and have been presented annually since 1965.

! 
|-
| 1966 || "Tumbling Down" || Single of the Year||  ||rowspan="2"| 
|-
| 1967 || "Handy Man" || Single of the Year ||  
|-

References

External links
AudioCulture profile
Maria Dallas
Re-entry as The Satellites celebrate 50th
Gerry still a pacemaker, Waikato Times, 29 January 2005

1946 births
Living people
New Zealand people of Croatian descent
20th-century New Zealand women singers
Viking Records artists
People from Morrinsville